Hechtsee is a lake in Tyrol, Austria. It is also the name of a scattered village (zerstreute Häuser). Both ar part of the Kufstein District.

The Austria–Germany border is located 20 meters north of the lake.

Lakes of Tyrol (state)
Kufstein